The 1937 Claxton Shield was the fourth annual Claxton Shield, an Australian national baseball tournament. It was held at Unley Oval in Adelaide from 7 to 14 August, the second time Adelaide had hosted the Shield. New South Wales won the Shield for the first time. Western Australia joined the tournament for the first time, becoming the fourth state to be represented. The other participating teams were Victoria and hosts South Australia.

Format
With the introduction of a fourth team to the tournament, changes were made to the format used in the three previous years. The four teams played a round-robin schedule, meeting each other team once, with two competition points were on offer in each game. The points were awarded as follows:
 Win – two points
 Tie – one point
 Loss – no points
At the end of these preliminary games, the top two teams played each other to determine the champions, while the remaining two teams faced each other to determine third place.

In the event of a tie between teams in terms of points, the tiebreaker used would have been the net runs for and against, with the team achieving the greater value placing in the higher position. This became a factor in the final preliminary game, between South Australia and Victoria. If South Australia had won, they would have tied with New South Wales and Victoria on points. Given the previous results in the tournament, South Australia needed to win by four or more runs to overtake Victoria on for and against, and therefore meet New South Wales in the championship game. Leading 1–0 in the bottom of the ninth inning, South Australia intentionally allowed Victoria to score a run to tie the game, and force extra innings. The plan failed though, as neither team was able to score any further runs, and the game was called after 14 innings because of the light. As a result, Victoria and New South Wales contested the final.

Results

Preliminaries

Finals

Third place final

Championship game

References

Bibliography
 
 

Claxton Shield
Claxton Shield
Claxton Shield
August 1937 sports events